The Ghosts of Highway 20 is the 12th studio album by American singer-songwriter Lucinda Williams. The double album was released on February 5, 2016, by Highway 20 Records. It was nominated for the Americana Music Award for Album of the Year.

"Bitter Memory" was performed by Connie Britton (as her character Rayna Jaymes) and Brad Paisley on the TV series Nashville. Britton's solo version appears on The Music of Nashville: Season 1, Volume 2.

Critical reception

The album received acclaim from music critics. At Metacritic, which assigns a normalized rating out of 100 to reviews from mainstream critics, the album received an average score of 83 based on 19 reviews, which indicates "universal acclaim". AllMusic wrote "after releasing one of the best and boldest albums of her career with Down Where the Spirit Meets the Bone, Williams goes from strength to strength with The Ghosts of Highway 20, and it seems like a welcome surprise that she's moving into one of the most fruitful periods of her recording career as she approaches her fourth decade as a musician. Will Hermes writing in Rolling Stone commends the album's "languorous tempos". Hermes notes the recent passing of the singer's father, poet Miller Williams, as casting "mortality's shadow" across several songs on the album.

Chart performance
The album debuted on the Billboard 200 at No. 36 on its release. It also debuted at No. 1 on the Folk Albums and Independent Albums charts, and No. 3 on the Top Rock Albums chart.

Track listing
All songs written by Lucinda Williams, except where noted.

Personnel
Carlton "Santa" Davis - drums
Bill Frisell - electric guitar
Greg Leisz - acoustic guitar, electric guitar
Val McCallum - electric guitar
Butch Norton - drums, percussion, background vocals
Ras Michael - hand drums, background vocals
David Sutton - bass guitar, background vocals
Lucinda Williams - acoustic guitar, electric guitar, lead vocals, background vocals

Charts

References

External links 
 
Lucinda Williams Official Website

2016 albums
Lucinda Williams albums